Prince Mohammad Bin Salman Nature Reserve located between NEOM Project and Red Sea Project northwest Saudi Arabia. It is one of the six royal reserves which were established by royal order in June 2018. It is managed by a legal identity and financial and administrative autonomy under the chairmanship of Crown Prince Mohammed Bin Salman.

Purpose  
Prince Mohammad Bin Salman Nature Reserve has an area of 24500 km. It is a suitable natural environment to resettle wild animals and plants while serving to reduce poaching, overgrazing, and logging in that area, and increase vegetation. Moreover, it conserves the natural environment of animals and plants and restores the ecological balance.

See also 
 List of protected areas of Saudi Arabia

References 

Protected areas of Saudi Arabia
Wildlife sanctuaries
Nature reserves in Saudi Arabia